G Tom Mac is the debut album of Gerard McMahon's group G Tom Mac. The album was produced by G Tom Mac and Tony Berg and was released on the Edge Artists record label in 2000.

Track listing
All songs written by Gerard McMahon, except where noted. 
"Half" – 3:33
"Shadow Walk" – 3:58 (McMahon, Gary Mallaber)
"Greatest Days on Earth" – 3:54
"Cry Little Sister" – 5:29 (McMahon, Michael Mainieri)
"Quiver of 19" – 3:11
"One Whiskey" – 4:16
"Happy Time" – 3:52
"Is Anybody Here?" – 5:07 (McMahon, Charlie Sexton)
 (duet with Charlie Sexton)
"Everyday Beauty"– 3:39
"Life Is Too Short"– 4:28

Personnel
 Charlie Sexton — guitar, bass
 Rob Ladd — drums
 Sean Pelton — drums
 Gary Mallaber — percussion, drums
 Laura Seaton-Finn — violin
 Mary Wooten — cello
 Ralph Farris — violin, viola
 Erik Friedlander — cello
 Paul Woodiel — violin
 Garo Yellin — cello

Notes

External links
 G Tom Mac's official website

2000 debut albums
G Tom Mac albums
Albums produced by Tony Berg